Slobodan Batričević (Serbian Cyrillic: Слободан Батричевић; born 3 January 1958) is a Serbian football manager and former player.

External links
 
 
 

Association football defenders
Austrian Football Bundesliga players
Expatriate footballers in Austria
First Vienna FC players
Footballers from Belgrade
LASK players
OFK Beograd players
Serbian football managers
Serbian footballers
Wiener Sport-Club managers
Yugoslav expatriate footballers
Yugoslav footballers
Yugoslav expatriates in Austria
Yugoslav First League players
Yugoslavia international footballers
1958 births
Living people